Hoar is an English surname, a variant of Hoare, and is derived from the Middle English hor(e) meaning grey- or white-haired. Notable people with the surname include:

 Ebenezer R. Hoar (1816–1895), influential American politician and lawyer
 George Frisbie Hoar (1826–1904), prominent United States politician
 Harold Frank Hoar (1909–1976), British architect and cartoonist (as 'Acanthus')
 Joseph P. Hoar (1934-2022), retired U.S. Marine Corps general
 Leonard Hoar (1630–1675), early American clergyman and educator
 Rockwood Hoar (1855–1906), member of the United States House of Representatives
 Roger Sherman Hoar (1887–1963), former state senator and assistant Attorney General of Massachusetts
 Samuel Hoar (1778–1856), United States lawyer and politician
 Sherman Hoar (1860–1898), American lawyer
 Syd Hoar (1895–1967), English footballer
 Thomas Bertie (1758–1825), Royal Navy officer born Thomas Hoar

See also 
 Hoar (disambiguation)

References